Stress–strength analysis is the analysis of the strength of the materials and the interference of the stresses placed on the materials, where "materials" is not necessarily the raw goods or parts, but can be an entire system.  Stress-Strength Analysis is a tool used in reliability engineering.

Environmental stresses have a distribution with a mean  and a standard deviation  and component strengths have a distribution with a mean  and a standard deviation . The overlap of these distributions is the probability of failure .  This overlap is also referred to stress-strength interference.

Reliability 
If the distributions for both the stress and the strength both follow a Normal distribution, then the reliability (R) of a component can be determined by the following equation: 
, where

P(Z) can be determined from a Z table or a statistical software package.

See also 

 First-order reliability method

References 

 http://reliawiki.org/index.php/Stress-Strength_Analysis
 http://www.engr.iupui.edu/me/courses/stressstrengthinterference.pdf

Mechanical failure
Reliability engineering
Risk analysis
Systems engineering